Tamata Rural LLG is a local-level government (LLG) of Oro Province, Papua New Guinea.

Wards
01. Huratan
02. Oitatande
03. Kikinonda
04. Korisata
05. Utukiari
06. Kurereda
07. Jino
08. Sia
09. Manau
10. Deboin
11. Kataure
12. Tubi
13. Aindi
14. Nindewari
15. Ewore
16. Bovera
17. Tave

References

Local-level governments of Oro Province